Kyra Poh (born 8 June 2002) is a Singaporean indoor skydiver.

Early life and education 
Kyra Poh studied visual arts in School of the Arts.

Career 
Poh was introduced to indoor skydiving in 2010 when her mother was working on advertising for iFly Singapore, an indoor skydiving facility located at Sentosa, Singapore. Poh and her friend, Choo Yi Xuan would go on to represent Singapore in competitions internationally as Team Firefly Singapore. The team debuted in 2014 at the Bodyflight World Challenge, competing in "Dynamic 2-way" and "2 way Freefly - Open" events, and was placed fifth in the open event.

In 2017, Poh took the gold medal in the solo speed category at the Wind Games, riding wind at speed of 230 km/h in a wind tunnel. For that, she was acknowledged as 'the world's fastest flyer'.

In 2018, Poh fractured her rib while jumping for an outdoor skydiving license. This delayed her from getting the license until in 2020, when she completed the course. 

Her training for indoor skydiving was interrupted during the COVID-19 pandemic in Singapore, when the 2020–21 Singapore circuit breaker measures prevented her and fellow athletes from using the wind tunnel facility at iFly Singapore until June 2021 when the lockdown measures began to loosen up.

In 2022, Poh was given a national-level sports scholarship that usually given to athletes participating the mainstream sports, thus becoming the first niche sports athlete to be awarded.

Achievements

References 

2002 births
Living people
Skydivers
Singaporean people of Chinese descent
Singaporean sportswomen